Ach or ACH may refer to:

Places 
A term for "river" in German hydronymy, see Aach (toponymy)
 Ach (Ammer), a tributary of the Ammer, Bavaria, Germany
 Ach (Blau), a tributary of the Blau, Baden-Württemberg, Germany
 Bregenzer Ach, a tributary of Lake Constance, Austria
 Dornbirner Ach, a tributary of Lake Constance, Austria
 Friedberger Ach, a tributary of the Lech, Bavaria, Germany
 Ach, Iran, a village in Qazvin Province

People
 Ach (surname)
 A. C. H. (born 1987), American professional wrestler Albert C. Hardie, Jr.
 Ach., taxonomic author abbreviation for Erik Acharius (1757–1819), Swedish botanist

Businesses
 ACH Food Companies, Inc., American subsidiary of Associated British Foods
 Aluminum Corporation of China Limited, a Chinese company
 Automotive Components Holdings, LLC, a Ford-managed temporary company mandated to dispose of unprofitable operations of Visteon, its former parts division

Hospitals
 Akron Children's Hospital, Akron, Ohio, US
 Alberta Children's Hospital, Calgary, Alberta, Canada
 Arkansas Children's Hospital, Little Rock, Arkansas, US

Medicine and science
 Acetone cyanohydrin, a highly toxic organic compound
 Acetylcholine (ACh), a neurotransmitter
 Achondroplasia, a genetic disorder that is a common cause of dwarfism
 Adrenocortical hormone, hormones produced by the adrenal cortex
 Aluminium chlorohydrate, an aluminium inorganic polymer used as a flocculant for water purification

Organizations
 Accion contra el Hambre, an NGO, part of the Action Against Hunger International Network
 Association for Computers and the Humanities, international professional society for digital humanities
  Association of Caribbean Historians

Sports
 AC Horsens, a Danish football club
 Allan Cup Hockey, a Canadian senior ice hockey league

Transportation
 Achnashellach railway station, UK, National Railway code ACH
 Adelaide-Crafers Highway
 Angeles Crest Highway, a two-lane highway over the San Gabriel Mountains
 St. Gallen–Altenrhein Airport, Switzerland,  IATA airport code

Other uses
 Acholi language (ach), ISO 639 code
 Advanced Combat Helmet, worn by army soldiers
 Air changes per hour, a unit in ventilation
 Analysis of competing hypotheses, an investigation methodology
 Automated clearing house, an electronic banking network used for payments and collections
 ACH Network, the national automated clearing house for electronic funds transfers in the USA